HSBC Saudi Arabia Limited is a joint venture between The Saudi British Bank (SABB) and HSBC Holdings plc, established in 2005, as a limited liability company headquartered in Riyadh, Saudi Arabia with a share capital of SAR 50 million (US$13.33 million).

It is the first full-service, independent investment bank to be established in the Kingdom of Saudi Arabia and serves as HSBC’s investment banking arm in the Kingdom.

The bank provide services in corporate finance, asset management, equity brokerage and security. It employs more than 300 employees. The bank is a component on the Tadawul Exchange.

HSBC Holdings of Britain held 49% stake in the joint venture with SABB holding 51% until October 2019 when HSBC Group acquired shares from SABB to become the major shareholder with 51% stake.

See also

 HSBC Bank Middle East
 SABB (Saudi bank)
 List of companies of Saudi Arabia

External links
HSBC Saudi Arabia

References

Banks of Saudi Arabia
Saudi
2005 establishments in Saudi Arabia
Banks established in 2005